The 1990 Nichirei International Championships was a women's tennis tournament played on outdoor hard courts at the Ariake Coliseum in Tokyo, Japan that was part of Tier II of the 1990 WTA Tour. It was the inaugural edition of the tournament and was held from 25 September through 30 September 1990. Fourth-seeded Mary Joe Fernández won the singles title and earned $70,000 first-prize money.

Finals

Singles
 Mary Joe Fernández defeated  Amy Frazier 3–6, 6–2, 6–3
 It was Fernández' first singles title of her career.

Doubles
 Mary Joe Fernández /  Robin White defeated  Gigi Fernández /  Martina Navratilova 4–6, 6–3, 7–6(7–4)

References

External links
 ITF tournament edition details
 Tournament draws

Nichirei International Championships
Nichirei International Championships
1990 in Japanese women's sport
1990 in Japanese tennis